David John Thomas (25 November 1911 – 19 September 2001) was a Welsh cricketer.  Thomas was a right-handed batsman who bowled slow left arm orthodox.  He was born at Swansea, Glamorgan.  Thomas was educated at Swansea University.

Thomas played a single first-class match for Glamorgan in the 1932 County Championship against Northamptonshire at St. Helen's, Swansea. In the match he scored 10* in his only first-class innings, leaving him without a career batting average. The success of fellow slow left arm orthodox spinners Wilf Jones and Emrys Davies meant Thomas' services were not called upon again.

Thomas died at the town of his birth on 19 September 2001.

References

External links
David Thomas at Cricinfo
David Thomas at CricketArchive

1911 births
2001 deaths
Cricketers from Swansea
Welsh cricketers
Glamorgan cricketers